C'est si bon is a 2015 South Korean musical drama film written and directed by Kim Hyun-seok. It was released on February 5, 2015.

C'est si bon (French for "It's so good") was a legendary, real-life acoustic music lounge in the 1970s located in Mugyo-dong, Seoul. It was very popular with Koreans in their twenties and thirties, who went there to listen to live music performed by some of the most talented young musicians of the era. Among them was the folk music duo Twin Folio composed of Yoon Hyung-joo and Song Chang-sik; this film depicts the band's beginnings while including a fictional third member, Oh Geun-tae.

Plot
In the late 1960s, C'est si bon was the music lounge every unknown acoustic band dreamed of playing, and where Korea's leading folk musicians were born. It is where Geun-tae, a naïve country boy, meets musical prodigies and rivals Hyung-joo and Chang-sik. Together they form a band and name themselves after the iconic venue — the C'est si bon Trio. As the three young musicians bicker over their music, beautiful socialite Ja-young enters the picture and becomes their muse, launching a series of moving love songs. Ja-young falls for the pure-hearted Geun-tae, but they part ways when she accepts a once-in-lifetime shot at an acting career. 20 years later in the 1990s, Geun-tae and Ja-young meet again.

Cast

Jung Woo as Oh Geun-tae (20s)
Kim Yoon-seok as Oh Geun-tae (40s)
Han Hyo-joo as Min Ja-young (20s)
Kim Hee-ae as Min Ja-young (40s)
Jin Goo as Lee Jang-hee (20s)
Jang Hyun-sung as Lee Jang-hee (40s)
Kang Ha-neul as Yoon Hyung-joo
Jo Bok-rae as Song Chang-sik
Kwon Hae-hyo as Kim Choon-sik
Choi Kyu-hwan as Teacher Lee
Lee Mi-so as Ran
Lee Ji-hoon as MC Lee
Park Sung-eun as Guk ("Soup")
Moon Ji-in as Juk ("Porridge")
Lee Dae-yeon as Geun-tae's father
Kim Mi-kyung as Geun-tae's mother
Oh Ha-nee as High School girl
Jung Yeon-joo as Wardrobe actress	
Ahn Jae-hong as Byeong-cheol
Lee Yong-yi as Geun-tae's aunt
Jo Wan-gi as Jae-pil
Jang Ji-in as Mi-ran
Lee Sang-hee as Writer Yeo
Kim In-kwon as Jo Young-nam (cameo)
Kim Jae-wook as Kang Myeong-chan (cameo)

Reception
C'est si bon was released in South Korea on February 5, 2015. It topped the box office on its opening weekend, with 642,000 admissions and  gross over four days, but it quickly dropped down the chart in the following weeks, eventually grossing a lackluster  from 1,715,370 admissions (halfway its break-even point of 3 million admissions).

Awards and nominations

References

External links
 

2010s musical drama films
South Korean musical drama films
CJ Entertainment films
2015 drama films
2015 films
2010s South Korean films